The IBM System/4 Pi is a family of avionics computers used, in various versions, on the F-15 Eagle fighter, E-3 Sentry AWACS, Harpoon Missile, NASA's Skylab, MOL, and the Space Shuttle, as well as other aircraft. Development began in 1965, deliveries in 1967.

It descends from the approach used in the System/360 mainframe family of computers, in which the members of the family were intended for use in many varied user applications. (This is expressed in the name: there are 4π steradians in a sphere, just as there are 360 degrees in a circle.)  Previously, custom computers had been designed for each aerospace application, which was extremely costly.

Models 
System/4 Pi consisted of basic models:
 Model TC (Tactical Computer) - A briefcase-size computer for applications such as missile guidance, helicopters, satellites and submarines. Weight: about 
 Model CP (Customized Processor/Cost Performance) - An intermediate-range processor for applications such as aircraft navigation, weapons delivery, radar correlation and mobile battlefield systems. Weight:  total
 Model CP-2 (Cost Performance - Model 2), weight 
 Model EP (Extended Performance) - A large-scale data processor for applications requiring real-time processing of large volumes of data, such as crewed spacecraft, airborne warning and control systems and command and control systems. Weight:

System/360 connections 
Connections with System/360:
 Main storage arrays of System/4 Pi were assembled from core planes that were militarized versions of those used in IBM System/360 computers
 Software was for both 360 and 4 Pi
 Model EP used an instruction subset of IBM System/360 (Model 44) - user programs could be checked on System/360

Uses 
The Skylab space station employed the model TC-1, which had a 16-bit word length and 16,384 words of memory with a custom input/output assembly.

AP-101
The AP-101, being the top-of-the-line of the System/4 Pi range, shares its general architecture with the System/360 mainframes.  It has 16 32-bit registers, and uses a microprogram to define an instruction set of 154 instructions.  Originally only 16 bits were available for addressing memory; later this was extended with four bits from the program status word register, allowing a directly addressable memory range of 1M locations. This avionics computer has been used in the U.S. Space Shuttle, the B-52 and B-1B bombers, and other aircraft. It is a repackaged version of the AP-1 used in the F-15 fighter.  When it was designed, it was a high-performance pipelined processor with core memory. While  its specifications are exceeded by most of the modern microprocessors, it was considered high-performance for its era as it could process 480,000 instructions per second (0.48 MIPS; compared to the 7,000 instructions per second (0.007 MIPS) of the computer used on Gemini spacecraft, while top-of-the line microprocessors as of 2020 are capable of performing more than 2,000,000 MIPS). It remained in service on the Space Shuttle because it worked, was flight-certified, and developing a new system would have been too expensive. The Space Shuttle AP-101s were augmented by glass cockpit technology.

The B-1B bomber employs a network of eight model AP-101F computers.

The AP-101B originally used in the Shuttle had core memory. The AP-101S upgrade in the early 1990s used semiconductor memory.  Each AP-101 on the Shuttle was coupled with an input-output processor (IOP), consisting of one Master Sequence Controller (MSC) and 24 Bus Control Elements (BCEs).  The MSC and BCEs executed programs from the same memory system as the main CPU, offloading control the Shuttle's serial data bus system from the CPU.

The Space Shuttle used five AP-101 computers as general-purpose computers (GPCs). Four operated in sync, for redundancy, while the fifth was a backup running software written independently. The Shuttle's guidance, navigation and control software was written in HAL/S, a special-purpose high-level programming language, while much of the operating system and low-level utility software was written in assembly language. AP-101s used by the US Air Force are mostly programmed in JOVIAL, such as the system found on the B-1B Lancer bomber.

References

Bibliography

External links
IBM Archive: IBM and the Space Shuttle
IBM Archive: IBM and Skylab
NASA description of Shuttle GPCs
NASA history of AP-101 development
Space Shuttle Computers and Avionics

Guidance computers
4999System 4 Pi
Military computers